T600 may refer to:
 Kenworth T600, a Class 8 truck built by Paccar
 Tango T600, an ultra-narrow electric sports car
 T-600, a fictional robot from Terminator series